Afioga Faaolesa Katopau Ainu’u is a Samoan politician and former Cabinet Minister. He is a member of the Human Rights Protection Party. 

Ainu’u was educated at the University of the South Pacific in Suva, Fiji, U.S. International University in San Diego, California, and the University of Hawaiʻi. He practised law in both Samoa and American Samoa, and was the owner of the Samoa Post newspaper. In 2008 he was charged in American Samoa with embezzlement, fraud and theft after he allegedly charged a client $5,000 for legal services he did not provide. An arrest warrant was issued, but never served, and was finally quashed in 2016.

He was first elected to the Legislative Assembly of Samoa at the 2016 Samoan general election and appointed Minister of Justice. As Minister of Justice he reinstated a previously-repealed criminal libel law. In 2017 he was accused of attempting to influence the President of the Land and Titles Court of Samoa over a case he was involved in. In 2018 he was accused of having files relating to his Ainu’u title illegally removed from the court and taken to his office. Ainu’u denied the claim, but Prime Minister Tuilaepa Aiono Sailele Malielegaoi claimed it was justified. Ministry of Justice Chief Executive Papali'i John Taimalelagi was later suspended, then fired for unlawfully releasing the files to the Minister. In December 2020 the law was amended to remove the Minister's control over court files.

Ainu’u is a supporter of the Land and Titles Bill.

Ainu’u lost his seat in the April 2021 Samoan general election.

References

Samoan people of Chinese descent
Members of the Legislative Assembly of Samoa
Justice ministers of Samoa
Living people
Year of birth missing (living people)
University of Hawaiʻi at Mānoa alumni
Samoan lawyers